Suspense Digest is the largest circulated monthly Urdu language suspense magazine in Pakistan. The approximately 290 to 320 pages magazine is published by JDP (Jasoosi Digest Publications). The first issue was launched in January 1972. The publication has been a member of the All Pakistan Newspapers Society since 24 August 1986.

The Jasoosi digest publications released other various digest like Jasoosi, Pakeeza, Sarguzasht and Dilkash. These family Urdu magazines are very famous in Pakistan. Suspense digest is based on social, romantic, history related stories. Magazine is monthly and released by the Jasoosi digest publications on particular dates of a month. Famous story writers of subcontinent like Mohiuddin Nawab, Ilyas Sitapuri, Zia Tasneem Bilgrami, MA Rahat and others are associated with these magazines.

The magazine published the world Longest fiction novel Devta from 1977 to 2010 written by Mohiuddin Nawab.

Most notable serial novels Suspense digest has published;

References

External links

Monthly magazines published in Pakistan
Magazines established in 1972
Magazines published in Pakistan
Mass media in Karachi
Urdu-language magazines
1972 establishments in Pakistan